Mike Regan (born July 17, 1978 in Albany, New York) is a retired lacrosse player.  He played for the Albany Attack, San Jose Stealth, and the Philadelphia Wings in the National Lacrosse League, and the Boston Cannons of Major League Lacrosse.

Regan attended high school at Christian Brothers Academy and played college lacrosse at Butler University. Regan also played in international tournaments on the 2002 and 2004 American Heritage Cup teams.

On January 10, 2004, Regan scored his fourth goal of the night with no time remaining to give the Stealth a 13-12 win over the Colorado Mammoth in their first-ever home game in San Jose.

Statistics

NLL

References

1978 births
Living people
American lacrosse players
Butler Bulldogs men's lacrosse players
Philadelphia Wings players
San Jose Stealth players
Sportspeople from Albany, New York